The karabin maszynowy obserwatora wz.37 (Polish for "Observers Machine Gun") is a Polish version of the Browning wz.1928. It was a flexible machine gun used in some Polish airplanes in the beginning of World War II.

History
In the mid-1930s, Polish small arms designer Wawrzyniec Lewandowski was given the task of developing a flexible gun based on the Browning wz.1928. The desired changes included raising the cyclical rate of fire to 1100 rds/min, replacing the buttstock with a spade grip at the rear of receiver, moving the main spring under barrel and, most importantly, changing the feed system. 

The gun's original 20 round box magazine was impractical with the gun's high rate of fire. A new feeding mechanism was added as a pack to the standard receiver. It contained a spring-loaded lever, which when cammed by the lock during locking would grab a round from a 91-round pan magazine located above the receiver and force the round into alignment to feed during unlocking.
The weapon is the world's only specialised aerial flexible machine gun based closely on the Browning M1918, or "Browning Automatic Rifle".
The wz.37 was dubbed "Szczeniak" (Polish for "pup") due to its lightness and compactness compared with previous Vickers E and Vickers F machine guns. The wz.37 was used mostly in Polish PZL.37 Łoś bombers.

Users

Similar Weapons
 MG 42, Nazi German

References
 

7.92×57mm Mauser machine guns
Light machine guns
Machine guns of Poland
World War II machine guns
Aircraft guns